Rosemary Campbell (born 1941) is a New Zealand artist and teacher.

Background 
Campbell was born in Timaru, New Zealand, in 1941.

Campbell attended the Ilam School of Fine Arts at the University of Canterbury. In 1974 she received a Queen Elizabeth II Arts Council Scholarship to study at the École des Beaux-Arts where she focused on lithography and etching.

Career 
Landscape and music are the major themes in Campbell's work although she does a considerable number of commissioned portraits. Campbell works predominantly in watercolour, and in oils for her portraiture.

After completing her Fine Arts degree, Campbell returned to South Canterbury and has taught at the Timaru Girls' High School, Craighead Diocesan School, and Aoraki Polytechnic.

Works by Campbell are held at the Christchurch Art Gallery Te Puna o Waiwhetu.

Exhibitions

Campbell has exhibited with the New Zealand Academy of Fine Arts and The Group in 1967, 1975, and 1976. In addition, her exhibitions have included:
 1964, 1967, 1969: South Canterbury Society of Arts 
 1966: Adult Education Rooms, Timaru 
 1967: Museum Foyer, Dunedin 
 1968, 1972: Dawson's Gallery, Dunedin 
 1968: Several Arts, Christchurch 
 1969, 1970, 1973, 1978, 1983, 1984: New Vision Gallery, Auckland 
 1970, 1979, 1981: Decor Gallery, Timaru 
 1971: Dreams Half Recalled, Canterbury Society of Arts 
 1972, 1981: Elva Betty Gallery, Wellington 
 1972: Bosshard Gallery, Akaroa 
 1973, 1983, 1989: Aiganthighe Art Gallery, Timaru 
 1975, 1976, 1981, 1987, 1989: Canterbury Society of Arts 
 1977, 1978, 1980: Brooke-Gifford Gallery, Christchurch 
 1979: Suter Gallery, Nelson 
 1979: BrookeGifford Gallery, Christchurch (with Dorothy Buchanan and the Canterbury Society of Arts members for Interpretations)  
 1979: Forrester Gallery, Oamaru 
 1980: New Vision, Auckland (with Dorothy Buchanan and members of the Auckland Symphonia) 
 1981: Louise Beale Gallery, Wellington 
 1981: Bosshard Gallery, Dunedin 
 1982: Graham Gallery, Wollongong, Australia 
 1982: Musical Evocations, Gaugh Gallery, Melbourne 
 1983, 1985: Louise Beale Gallery, Wellington

References

Further reading 
Artist files for Campbell are held at:
 Angela Morton Collection, Takapuna Library
 E. H. McCormick Research Library, Auckland Art Gallery Toi o Tāmaki
 Robert and Barbara Stewart Library and Archives, Christchurch Art Gallery Te Puna o Waiwhetu
 Fine Arts Library, University of Auckland
 Hocken Collections Uare Taoka o Hākena
 Te Aka Matua Research Library, Museum of New Zealand Te Papa Tongarewa
Also see:
 Concise Dictionary of New Zealand Artists McGahey, Kate (2000) Gilt Edge

External links 
 Official website

1944 births
New Zealand painters
New Zealand women painters
Ilam School of Fine Arts alumni
École des Beaux-Arts alumni
People from Timaru
People associated with the Canterbury Society of Arts
University of Canterbury alumni
Living people
New Zealand schoolteachers
People associated with The Group (New Zealand art)